The 55th Writers Guild of America Awards, given in 2003, honored the film and television best writers of 2002.

Film

Best Original Screenplay
 Bowling for Columbine - Michael Moore
Antwone Fisher - Antwone Fisher
Far from Heaven - Todd Haynes
Gangs of New York - Jay Cocks, Kenneth Lonergan and Steven Zaillian 
My Big Fat Greek Wedding - Nia Vardalos

Best Adapted Screenplay
 The Hours - David Hare
About a Boy - Peter Hedges, Chris and Paul Weitz
About Schmidt - Alexander Payne and Jim Taylor
Adaptation. - Charlie and Donald Kaufman
Chicago - Bill Condon

Television

Best Episodic Comedy
 Frasier - Bob Daily, Lori Kirkland and Dan O'Shannon for "Rooms With a View"
The Bernie Mac Show - Larry Wilmore for "Pilot"
Ed - Jon Beckerman and Rob Burnett for "The Wedding"
Scrubs - Bill Lawrence for "My First Day (Pilot)"
Sex and the City - Cindy Chupack for "Plus One Is the Loneliest Number"
Sex and the City - Michael Patrick King for "I Heart NY"
Sex and the City - Julie Rottenberg; Elisa Zuritsky for "Change of a Dress"

Best Episodic Drama
 The Education of Max Bickford - Dawn Prestwich and Nicole Yorkin for "Pilot"
ER - John Wells for "On the Beach"
Resurrection Blvd. - Robert Eisele for "Nino Del Polvo"
Six Feet Under - Christian Taylor for "In Place of Anger"
The Sopranos - Mitchell Burgess and Robin Green for "Whoever Did This"
The West Wing - Paul Redford and Aaron Sorkin for "Game On"

References
WGA - Previous award winners

2002
2002 awards in the United States
2002 film awards
2002 guild awards
2002 television awards
2002 in American cinema
2002 in American television
March 2003 events in the United States